Yakke Wali is a 1957 Pakistani Punjabi language film directed by M. J. Rana and produced by Bari Malik. It tells the story of a woman who earns a living by driving a tanga. Musarrat Nazir played the title role in the film with Sudhir, M. Ajmal and Neelo in prominent roles. Yakke Wali is inspired by the short story "License" by Saadat Hassan Manto.

Yakke Wali was successful at the box office and received rave reviews. The film was such a samsh hit at the boxoffice, that the producer of film built a film studio by the film's earning in Lahore, Bari Studio.

Plot 
Yakke Wali revolves around a hardworking and brave Punjabi woman, Laali, who supports her family by driving a tanga. She drives around her village but one day owing to her fight with some of the villagers, she leaves the village and goes to the city of Lahore.  Being a female in Lahore, it becomes difficult for her to drive the tanga, so she decides to disguise herself as a man and starts driving for her survival and to make a daily living.

Cast 
 Musarrat Nazir as Laali
 Sudhir as Aslam
 M. Ajmal
 Neelo
 Ilyas Kashmiri
 Zeenat Begum
 Sultan Rahi (as extra character)

Music 

All music is scored by music director Ghulam Ahmed Chishti and film songs and dialogue were by Ahmad Rahi.

References

External links 
 

1957 films
Pakistani musical drama films
1950s Punjabi-language films
Pakistani black-and-white films
1957 musical films